Steven Creyelman (born Dendermonde, 25 October 1972) is a Belgian-Flemish politician for Vlaams Belang (VB) and since 2019 an MP in the Chamber of Representatives.

Creyelman studied engineering at EHSAL in Brussels. From 2001 to 2017, he also owned the web design company Webbreezer Solutions in Bruges and in 2009, became a webmaster for Vlaams Belang. He has also served as the spokesman and chairman for the party in the Dendermonde-Sint-Niklaas region. In the 2019 Belgian federal election, Creyelman was elected to the Belgian federal parliament for the East Flanders region representing the VB. Creyelman is also a councilor for Buggenhout municipal council.

References 

Living people
21st-century Belgian politicians
1972 births
Vlaams Belang politicians
Members of the Belgian Federal Parliament
Flemish politicians